Karen A. Hudson-Edwards is a Canadian mineralogist and geochemist. She is Professor for Sustainable Mining jointly between the Camborne School of Mines and Environment & Sustainability Institute, University of Exeter.

Career 
Hudson-Edwards was born in Canada and studied geology at Queen's University and the Memorial University of Newfoundland. In 1996 she received her PhD from the University of Manchester. 

Subsequently, she worked in the Department of Earth and Planetary Sciences at Birkbeck, University of London, for almost 20 years, before joining the Environment & Sustainability Institute and Camborne School of Mines in October 2017. Her research focuses on the environmental impact of mine wastes, including understanding their character, stability, impact, remediation, and reuse. 

In 2019 she was invited to be the European Association of Geochemistry (EAG) Distinguished Lecturer for 2019. Hudson-Edwards has authored more than 120 scientific articles and has an h-index of 41. 

In addition to her research, she advises the Eden Project with their Living Worlds Exhibit which is on display until 2023. Furthermore, Hudson-Edwards is advising the law commission on their consultation on Regulating Coal Tip Safety in Wales. She is an editor for the peer-reviewed journal GeoHealth, and associate editor for Frontiers in Earth Sciences, and Geoscience and Society.

References

Year of birth missing (living people)
Living people
Canadian women geologists
Canadian women chemists
Canadian expatriate academics in the United Kingdom
Canadian mineralogists
Women mineralogists
Canadian geochemists
Queen's University at Kingston alumni
Academics of the University of Exeter
Academics of Birkbeck, University of London
Memorial University of Newfoundland alumni
Women geochemists
Alumni of the University of Manchester